The ITFA Best Movie Award is given as part of International Tamil Film Awards for Tamil  (Kollywood) films.

Winners
Following is a list of the award winners and the films for which they won.

See also

 Tamil cinema
 Cinema of India

References

Movie
Awards for best film